Simone Pizzuti (born 28 July 1990) is an Italian footballer who plays for Lega Pro Seconda Divisione club Lecco.

Biography
Born in Rome, Lazio, Pizzuti started his career with Lombardy club Mantova. After the club went bankrupt, he was signed by Lecco.

Pizzuti also played for feeder teams of Italy U21: for U21 Serie B team in an internal training match in November 2009 and U20 Lega Pro team in internal training match in September 2010.

References

External links
 Football.it Profile 
 Lecco Profile 

Italian footballers
Serie B players
Mantova 1911 players
Calcio Lecco 1912 players
Association football defenders
Footballers from Rome
1990 births
Living people